Tigridiopalma is a genus of flowering plants belonging to the family Melastomataceae.

Its native range is Southeastern China.

Species:
 Tigridiopalma magnifica C.Chen

References

Melastomataceae
Melastomataceae genera